Viliami Vaki (born 27 April 1976) is a Tongan rugby union footballer. He represented Tonga at the 2003 Rugby World Cup and the 2007 Rugby World Cup. From 2003 to 2005 he played for Gran Rugby in Italy, then moved to USA Perpignan in the Top 14. He currently plays for Reggio in the Top12.

He made his debut for Tonga in May 2001 in a match against Fiji in which he was a part of the starting line-up. He played four other Tests that year, another against Fiji and one against Samoa, Scotland and Wales. In 2002 he was capped five times for Tonga, once against Japan and twice against both Fiji and Samoa.

He played in four Tests in early-mid-2003 and was then included in Tonga's 2003 Rugby World Cup squad in Australia. He played in four games during the tournament, all in the starting line-up; Italy, Wales, the All Blacks and Canada. He next played for Tonga in June 2005, with matches against Fiji and Samoa. Later that year he captained Tonga in two matches in November, one against Italy and one against France. He has also represented the Pacific Islanders after making his debut in 2006. He has 33 caps and 35 points (7 tries) for Tonga. He has 3 caps for the Pacific Islanders.

External links
 Perpignan profile
 Pacific Islanders profile
 Scrum profile
 RWC 2003 profile

1976 births
Living people
Tongan rugby union players
Rugby union flankers
USA Perpignan players
Tonga international rugby union players
Pacific Islanders rugby union players
Tongan expatriate rugby union players
Expatriate rugby union players in Italy
Expatriate rugby union players in France
Tongan expatriate sportspeople in Italy
Tongan expatriate sportspeople in France
People from Vavaʻu
Rugby sevens players at the 2002 Commonwealth Games
Tonga international rugby sevens players